The Pahari people, (Devanagari: पहाड़ी; ; Pahāṛ also called Pahadi and Parbati, are an indigenous group  of the Himalayas. In Nepal, the Paharis constituted one of the largest indigenous ethnic group at about 8,000,000, or one-third of the Nepalese population through the 1990s. Most Indo-Aryan Paharis, however, identify as members of constituent subgroups and castes within the larger Pahari community such as Brahmin (Bahun in Nepal), Kshatriya (Chhetri in Nepal) and Dalits. 

The name Pahari derives from pahar (पहाड़), meaning "hill", and corresponds to the Himalayan Hill Region which the Paharis inhabit. Nepali interpretation generally includes Pahari as constituting the dominant Khas, indicating a contrast to that of these Indo-Aryan ethnicities with that of the Tibetan or Janjati origins like Magar, Tamang, Gurung, Kirat, among others. Pahari may also contrast geography alone.

History

The Paharis are historically ancient, having been mentioned by the authors Pliny and Herodotus and figuring in India's epic poem, the Mahābhārata. References to Brahmins and Kshatriyas are found in Banawali (Tantric texts) on Nepal, in whose ancient setting Kathmandu was still a lake. Pahadi brahmins are Brahmins migrated from India to Nepali territory. Before they were migrated to Nepal. After passing of several dynasties the brahmins entered the Nepal for purpose like worshiping for Khasa kings and serving for them in religious actions. After passing of several years they became one of the major ethnic group of Nepal. The four Narayana temples around the valley were established by these Vaishnava people.

Before Nepal was united as a nation under the Shah dynasty (1768–2008), smaller kingdoms in the region were ruled by kings of various ethnic and caste groups. The ancient name of this Himalayan region was Khas Desh. Most populous among the people of this mid-mountainous area were the Khas people, also mentioned in the histories of India and China. The Khas people, indigenous Indo-Aryan mountain dwellers, spread to dominate the hills of Central Himalaya and played important role in the history of the region, establishing many independent dynasties in early medieval times. The Khas people had an empire, the Kaśa Kingdom, whose territory extended to Kashmir, part of Tibet, and Western Nepal (Karnali Zone).

In the early modern history of Nepal, Pahari Chhetris played a key role in the unification of Nepal, providing the backbone of the Gorkha army of the mid-18th century. During the monarchy, Chhetris and Bahuns continued to dominate the ranks of the Nepalese Army, Nepalese government administration, and even some regiments of the Indian Army. Under the pre-democratic constitution and institutions of the state, Chhetri culture and language also dominated multiethnic Nepal to the disadvantage and exclusion of many Nepalese minorities and Tibetan peoples. The desire for increased self-determination among these minorities and Tibetan Janajati peoples was one of the central issues in the Nepalese Civil War and subsequent democratic movement.

During the Shah Dynasty, the Paharis began to settle the Terai region. Politically, socially, and economically dominant over the Tharu under the conservative system of the monarchy, the Pahari community in the Terai purchased, or otherwise got hold of large landholdings. Together with traditional Tharu landlords, they constitute the upper level of the economic hierarchy, which in the rural parts of the Terai is determined to a large extent by the distribution and the value of agriculturally productive land. The poor are the landless, or near landless, Terai Dalits, including the Musahar and Chamar, as well as the traditional fishermen, the Mallah, and some of the hill Dalits. In particular the Musahars rarely get other work than hard farm labour. During and after the Nepalese Civil War, Paharis faced a violent backlash by the marginalized Madhesi community including ransoming, murder, and land dispossession by armed Maoist groups such as the Janatantrik Terai Mukti Morcha (JTMM) seeking Madhesi independence.

Languages

The Pahari people speak Indo-Aryan languages like Nepali.

Religion and castes

Most Nepalese Paharis are Hindus, with the exception of the shamanistic and oracular Matwali ("drinking") Khasa Chhetris. Hindu Paharis are generally more conscious of their caste (Varna, Jāti) and status than their Tibetan neighbors, especially those Paharis living in rural Nepal. However, as a result of extensive historical contact with non-Hindu Nepalese, the Pahari caste structure is less orthodox and less complex than the traditional four-fold system in the plains to the south. The Pahari system is generally two-fold, consisting of the higher clean, Dvija castes and the lower unclean, Dalit castes. The Dvija (twice-born) include the Bahun (Brahmin) and Chhetri (Kshatriya) castes. 

Chhetris as a caste comprise many subgroups, including Khas (clans from Khas) and Thakuri (aristocratic clans). The Khas subgroups are aboriginal of Karnali Zone.

Society

The most prominent features of Nepalese Pahari society have been the Chhetri Shah dynasty (1768–2008), the Rana Prime Ministers that marginalized the monarchy (1846–1953), and its upper-caste presence in the armed forces, police, and government of Nepal. The King of Nepal himself was a member of the Chhetri Thakuri subcaste. In traditional and administrative professions, upper-caste Paharis were given favourable treatment by the royal government.

Historically, Hindu Paharis have practiced a spectrum of marital customs including monogamy, polygamy (both polyandry and polygyny), and group marriage. Girls under age 10 may be betrothed, though they cohabit with their husbands only when they reach maturity. Wives must be faithful to their husbands while with them, however when wives visit their parents, they may behave as if unmarried. Most upper-caste Paharis do not practice cross-cousin marriage, however the aristocratic Thakuri subcaste allows marriage of maternal cross-cousins. Among all Paharis, remarriage by widows is formally prohibited by social norms; however an institution called "Jari" ( Sanskrit "Jarah" debauchery, paramour) exists. In this practice among Pahari hill dwellers, a woman will take a paramour, leaving her first husband. The second husband must pay the first husband "Jar dine" for the loss of his wife. Among Pahari families, death is treated by both burial and cremation. Low status individuals, such as children and some women are buried. Also, indigenous healers known as "Jhankri" are buried with their fontanelle pierced to allow their spirit to rise to the spirit world. Others, high caste and wealthy, are cremated per classic HIndu tradition.

Lifestyle

The Paharis, like the Madhesis are not an agricultural people although a majority also rely on other activities for supplementary income. Cultivating terraces on the hillsides, their chief crops are potatoes and rice. Other crops include wheat, barley, onions, tomatoes, tobacco, and other vegetables. Pahari farmers raise water buffalo, sheep, goats, and cattle.

Most higher-caste Paharis are military men, farmers and civil servants, while lower-caste Paharis hold a variety of occupations including goldsmiths, leather workers, tailors, musicians, drummers, and sweepers. Most Paharis spin wool, however only lower-castes weave fabrics. Upper-caste Paharis, namely Chhetri and its Thakuri subcaste, held a virtual monopoly on government and military offices throughout the Shah Dynasty (1768–2008).

See also
Hill Region
Himalayas
Terai
Demographics of Nepal

References

Ethnic groups in Nepal